The Anglo-Italian League Cup (also known as the Anglo-Italian League Cup Winners' Cup) was a short-lived football competition between teams from England and Italy – an English cup-winning team (League Cup or FA Cup) and the Coppa Italia winner, playing each other over two legs. It was contested between 1969–71 and 1975–76.

The competition was set up at the same time as the Anglo-Italian Cup in 1969.

History
The Football League Cup was changed in 1967 so the winner would be awarded a place in the Inter-Cities Fairs Cup. But UEFA did not allow third-tier teams to compete in the Inter-Cities Fairs Cup at that time. When Queens Park Rangers won the 1967 League Cup final they were in the Third Division, as were Swindon Town when they won the 1969 League Cup.

The Anglo-Italian League Cup was organised as a way of compensating Swindon for the ruling that prevented them competing in the Inter-Cities Fairs Cup in 1969. A two-legged match was organised with that year's Coppa Italia champions A.S. Roma. The first-leg was held at the Stadio Olimpico, with Roma winning 2–1, but that deficit was overturned in the return leg at the County Ground, Swindon where Swindon won 4–0 making them champions with a 5–2 aggregate.

In 1970, Coppa Italia winners Bologna defeated League Cup winners Manchester City with a 3–2 win on aggregate. The 1971 competition was the last for a few years and League Cup winners Tottenham Hotspur defeated Coppa Italia winners Torino 3–0 on aggregate.

It was briefly reinstated in 1975 (winners Fiorentina), this time between the FA Cup and Coppa Italia winners, but only lasted two seasons before being finally scrapped in 1976 (winners Napoli).

Winners
Key

See also
 Anglo-Italian Cup

References

External links
 Anglo-Italian League Cup history on RSSSF
 Auction description for a 1971 winner's medal

Defunct international club association football competitions in Europe
Defunct football competitions in England
Defunct football competitions in Italy
Anglo-Italian Cup
1969 establishments in Europe
1976 disestablishments in Europe
Recurring sporting events established in 1969
Recurring sporting events disestablished in 1976